Kastelbell-Tschars is a comune (municipality) in South Tyrol in northern Italy, located about  northwest of Bolzano.

Geography

Kastelbell-Tschars borders the following municipalities: Latsch, Naturns, Schnals and Ulten.

History

Coat-of-arms
The emblem is a gules mill wheel, with eight paddles, on argent background. It retakes the insignia of Counts Hendl owners of the castle from 1531 to 1949.

Society

Linguistic distribution
According to the 2011 census, 98.72% of the population speak German and 1.28% Italian as first language.

Demographic evolution

References

External links
 Homepage of the municipality

Municipalities of South Tyrol